Sabis Vallis is an ancient river valley in the Memnonia quadrangle of Mars, located at 5.3° south latitude and 152.5° west longitude.  It is 206 km long and was named after a classical name for the present Sambre River in France and Belgium.

References

Valleys and canyons on Mars
Memnonia quadrangle